The Imperial Japanese Army's  was renumbered from the Imperial Guards Division in June 1943, when the 1st Guards Division was activated.

Its organization was:

2nd Guards Division
 3rd Guards Infantry Regiment
 4th Guards Infantry Regiment
 5th Guards Infantry Regiment
 Guards Recon Regiment
 2nd Guards Field Artillery Regiment
 2nd Guards Field Engineer Regiment
 Support units

See also
Imperial Guard (Japan)

References 
 Madej, W. Victor, Japanese Armed Forces Order of Battle, 1937-1945 [2 vols] Allentown, PA: 1981.

Guards Divisions of Japan
Military units and formations established in 1943
Military units and formations disestablished in 1945
1943 establishments in Japan
1945 disestablishments in Japan

ja:近衛師団